Otello Sorato (born 22 May 1954) is a former Italian male long-distance runner who competed at one edition of the IAAF World Cross Country Championships at senior level (1980).

References

External links
 Otello Sorato profile at Association of Road Racing Statisticians

1954 births
Living people
Italian male long-distance runners